Xinshi Bridge, or Xinshi Qiao, is a bridge in Suzhou, China.

References

Bridges in Suzhou